Lars-Arne Bölling, born Lars Arne Torsten 6 October 1944 in Sörsjön, Sweden, is a Swedish former cross-country skier competing for IFK Mora and Orsa IF at club level. He won Vasaloppet in 1970 and 1972. He became Swedish national champion in the 15 kilometers race in 1970, and in the 1973 30 kilometers race as well as the 1970 and 1971 50 kilometers races. He was also part of the IFK Mora team winning the Swedish national relay championship in 1970-1973, and in 1974 he won the same relay title with Orsa IF.

In 1970, he was awarded the Sixten Jernberg Award. and he also represented Sweden during the Olympic Winter Games of 1972 in Sapporo, where he ended up 9th in the 50 kilometers race. In 1973 he won the Marcialonga race in Italy.

He is the son Arne Bölling, who ended up second at Vasaloppet 1943, and the brother's son of Stig Bölling.

Cross-country skiing results

Olympic Games

References 

1944 births
Cross-country skiers at the 1972 Winter Olympics
Living people
Olympic cross-country skiers of Sweden
Swedish male cross-country skiers
Vasaloppet winners
IFK Mora skiers